M. Selvaraj was an Indian politician and former Member of the Legislative Assembly of Tamil Nadu. He was elected to the Tamil Nadu legislative assembly from Vridhachalam constituency as an Independent candidate  in 1957 election, and as a Dravida Munnetra Kazhagam candidate in 1971 election, and as a Dravida Munnetra Kazhagam candidate from Kurinjipadi constituency in 1977 election.

References 

Dravida Munnetra Kazhagam politicians
Living people
Year of birth missing (living people)